Cres is an island in the Adriatic in Croatia.

Cres or CRES may also refer to:

 Cres (town), a town on the eponymous island
 Cres (mythology), a term in Greek mythology
 CRES, corrosion-resistant steel
 CRES, the Socialized Economy Regulatory Council in 20th century Valencia, Spain
 CRES, the Center For Renewable Energy Sources, Greek agency for energy efficiency in Europe

See also
 Le Crès
 Kres (disambiguation)